Hemidactylus carivoensis is a species of gecko. It is endemic to Angola.

References

Hemidactylus
Geckos of Africa
Reptiles of Angola
Endemic fauna of Angola
Reptiles described in 2021